The Infographics Show is a YouTube channel and video content farm that features animated videos about educational topics. Common themes include history, current events, true crime, as well as pseudoscientific topics like Ufology. They also create fictional scenarios narrated from the 1st-person point of view, like surviving nuclear war, surviving the plague, surviving World War 3, and surviving the invasion. New videos are uploaded daily. Andrej Preston is the Motion Graphics Designer & Producer for the show. The show began in the United States.

The creators use Adobe After Effects to animate the videos, as well as premade assets and templates from Envato Elements.

They also have two branch channels, named SCP Explained — Story & Animation, which exclusively covers animated stories and tales about the SCP Foundation, and Backrooms Explained, which does the same for The Backrooms, the former of which, in turn, are part of a collaborative channel named ODDity which, as well as covering SCP content, also makes videos of various creepypastas and cryptids.

References

External links
 The Infographics Show on IMDb

SCP Foundation
Education-related YouTube channels
YouTube channels launched in 2011
English-language YouTube channels